António-Pedro Saraiva de Barros e Vasconcelos GCIH (born 10 March 1939 in Leiria) is a Portuguese film director.

Personal life
Vasconcelos is the middle of three sons of Guilherme de Barros e Vasconcelos (Celorico de Basto, Britelo, 28 December 1902 - 1984), a lawyer and a nobleman of the Royal Household, and Palmira Henriqueta de Carvalho Saraiva (b. Portalegre, 28 August 1907).

In 1961, Vasconcelos married Maria Helena Marques (born 26 July 1939), whom he later divorced. His second wife, Maria Teresa de Carvalho de Albuquerque Schmidt, and had four children: Pedro Jaime Marque, Guilherme Infante de Lacerda, Patrícia Marques and Diogo Schmidt.

He is a known supporter of S.L. Benfica.

Filmography
Exposição de Tapeçaria (1968)
Indústria Cervejeira em Portugal - 2 (1968)
Tapeçaria - Tradição Que Revive (1968)
27 Minutos Com Fernando Lopes Graça (1969)
Fernando Lopes Graça (1971)
Perdido por Cem... (1973)
Adeus, Até ao Meu Regresso (1974)
Emigr/Antes... E Depois? (1976)
Oxalá (1981)
O Lugar do Morto (1984)
Aqui D'El Rei! (1992)
Jaime (1999)
Os Imortais (2003)
Call Girl (2007)
A Bela e o Paparazzo (2010)
Parque Mayer (2018)
KM 224 (2022)

References

External links
 

1939 births
Living people
Portuguese film directors
People from Leiria